Taishi Narikuni (born 13 November 1997) is a Japanese freestyle wrestler. He won the gold medal in the men's 70kg event at the 2022 World Wrestling Championships held in Belgrade, Serbia. He also won the gold medal in his event at the 2022 Asian Wrestling Championships held in Ulaanbaatar, Mongolia.

His mother Akiko Iijima is a four-time medalist at the World Wrestling Championships, including two gold medals (1990 and 1991).

Achievements

References

External links
 

Living people
1997 births
Sportspeople from Tokyo
Japanese male sport wrestlers
World Wrestling Champions
Asian Wrestling Championships medalists
21st-century Japanese people